McCombe is a (patronymic or paternal) family name. Variants of which include: McColm, McComb, McCome and McKomb.

McCombe is one of the sept names of the Scottish Clan MacThomas.

Notable people with this surname (or similar) include:
Alan McCombes (born 1955), Scottish politician
Jamie McCombe (born 1983), English football (soccer) defender
Jim McCombe (1932–2011), Leader of the Golden Hawks RCAF air demonstration team
John McCombe (born 1985), English football (soccer) defender
John McComb Jr. (1763–1853), Architect of New York City Hall and many other buildings in NY and NJ 
Leonard McCombe (1923–2015), Manx-born American photojournalist